Francis Macdonald (born 11 September 1970) drums with Teenage Fanclub. He makes music for filmmakers and TV and manages Camera Obscura and The Vaselines.

On 30 March 2015, he released Music For String Quartet, Piano And Celeste, described by Classic FM as "sublime, minimalist classical music". It debuted at Number 12 in the Official Classical Artists Album Chart and ad Number 3 in the Official Specialist Classical Chart.

The album was recorded at Mogwai's Castle Of Doom Studios in Glasgow and features a quartet from the Scottish Ensemble.

Career
Macdonald recorded a solo album called Sauchiehall & Hope - A Pop Opera under the pseudonym "Nice Man" and The Art of Hanging Out as "Nice Man and the Bad Boys".  In 2011, he recorded two digital albums of instrumental music - Maculate Conceptions and Maculate Conceptions Volume 2 on Garageband on his Mac computer during a Teenage Fanclub tour of Europe. All of these albums are available online.

He runs Shoeshine Records / Spit & Polish in Glasgow. He has co-produced albums by Aaron Wright, Attic Lights and Aaron Fyfe.

Other artists with whom he has worked include: Kevin Ayers, Kim Fowley, Robert Forster, Dan Penn, Alex Chilton, John Herald, Chip Taylor, Ben Vaughn, Laura Cantrell, Kate Rusby, Belle & Sebastian, Looper, Future Pilot A.K.A., The Hermit Crabs, The Pastels, Radio Sweethearts, Michael Shelley, Cheeky Monkey, Frank Blake, Speeder, Astro Chimp, BMX Bandits, Attic Lights and Harry Pye.

References

Scottish rock drummers
British male drummers
1970 births
Living people
Teenage Fanclub members
21st-century drummers
21st-century British male musicians